Joschka Beck (born 22 March 1993) is a German racing cyclist, who last rode for German amateur team RC Silber-Pils 03 Bellheim/Pfalz. He finished ninth at the 2014 Tobago Cycling Classic, and he rode in the men's team time trial at the 2016 UCI Road World Championships.

References

External links
 

1993 births
Living people
German male cyclists
Place of birth missing (living people)